The discography of Blue October, an American rock band, consists of ten studio albums, five live albums, two video albums, two extended plays, twenty-five singles and twenty-two music videos.

Albums

Studio albums

Live albums

Video albums

Extended plays

Singles

Music videos

Notes

References

External links
Official website
Blue October at AllMusic

Rock music group discographies
Discographies of American artists
Discography